Sita Eliya is a village in Sri Lanka. It is located within Central Province.

Places of interest

Seetha Amman Temple
The Seetha Amman Temple is believed to be the site where Sita was held captive by Ravana, and where she prayed daily for Rama to come and rescue her in the Hindu epic, Ramayana.

See also
List of towns in Central Province, Sri Lanka

External links

References

Populated places in Nuwara Eliya District